Marko Milačić (born 22 May 1985) is a Montenegrin politician. He is the founder and current president of minor right-wing populist political party True Montenegro. He ran for president of Montenegro in the 2018 election, and received 2.8% of the popular vote.

Biography 
Milačić completed elementary and secondary school in Podgorica, graduated and obtained a master's degree in journalism at the Faculty of Political Sciences of the University of Montenegro. He is fluent in Serbian and English. Milačić worked for the Montenegrin national public service (RTCG) as a reporter and news presenter for several years.

Political career 
In 2014, Milačić became one of the founders of the non-governmental organization Movement for Neutrality of Montenegro.

Through the years he maintained cooperation with a number of populist politicians and activists, such as Croatian Human Shield founders Ivan Pernar and Ivan Vilibor Sinčić, Bosnian conceptual artist Damir Nikšić and Serbian-Canadian film director and right-wing political activist Boris Malagurski.

He decided to enter political life in 2016 by joining the newly founded Mladen Bojanić's Resistance to Hopelessness (OB), an anti-establishment and anti-NATO political movement, and become member of Democratic Front (DF) electoral list for 2016 parliamentary election, but failed to enter the Parliament. After Bojanić's abandonment of OB in 2017, Milačić became de facto leader of movement. In February 2018, he established the populist political party True Montenegro and ran as the party's candidate for President of Montenegro in the April 2018 elections; he received 2.8% of the votes.

See also
 Montenegrin presidential election, 2018
 Montenegrin parliamentary election, 2020

References

1985 births
Living people
Politicians from Podgorica
Serbs of Montenegro